The Tzahar region is part of Galilee, in Israel. Its name is an acronym for the three cities it contains: Safed (Tzfat), Hazor HaGelilit and Rosh Pinna. The population of the region is almost entirely Jewish and numbers 40,000.

It is twinned with West Palm Beach, Florida, United States.

Tzahar